Memecylon bequaertii is a species of plant in the family Melastomataceae. It is found in the Democratic Republic of the Congo and Uganda.

References

bequaertii
Vulnerable plants
Taxonomy articles created by Polbot